Franklin Township is a township in Erie County, Pennsylvania, United States.  As of the 2020 census, the township population was 1,512, which is down from the population of 1,633 in 2010.

Geography

Demographics

As of the census of 2000, there were 1,609 people, 554 households, and 464 families residing in the township.  The population density was 55.9 people per square mile (21.6/km).  There were 569 housing units at an average density of 19.8/sq mi (7.6/km).  The racial makeup of the township was 99.19% White, 0.12% African American, 0.12% Asian, 0.12% from other races, and 0.44% from two or more races. Hispanic or Latino of any race were 0.25% of the population.

There were 554 households, out of which 39.2% had children under the age of 18 living with them, 69.9% were married couples living together, 7.6% had a female householder with no husband present, and 16.2% were non-families. 12.8% of all households were made up of individuals, and 4.7% had someone living alone who was 65 years of age or older.  The average household size was 2.90 and the average family size was 3.16.

In the township, the population was spread out, with 29.0% under the age of 18, 6.0% from 18 to 24, 30.1% from 25 to 44, 27.1% from 45 to 64, and 7.7% who were 65 years of age or older.  The median age was 37 years. For every 100 females, there were 99.9 males.  For every 100 females age 18 and over, there were 100.0 males.

The median income for a household in the township was $49,483, and the median income for a family was $50,789. Males had a median income of $36,759 versus $26,310 for females. The per capita income for the township was $17,898.  About 2.0% of families and 3.0% of the population were below the poverty line, including 4.1% of those under age 18 and 5.9% of those age 65 or over.

References

External links
Franklin Township official website

Townships in Erie County, Pennsylvania
Townships in Pennsylvania